Clinton Township is one of sixteen townships in Elkhart County, Indiana. As of the 2020 census, its population was 4,870, up from 4,624 at the previous census.

According to the 2020 "ACS 5-Year Estimates Data Profiles", 41.4% of the township's population spoke only English, while 57.2 spoke an "other [than Spanish] Indo-European language" (basically Pennsylvania German/German).

History
Clinton Township was named for the son of a pioneer settler.

Demographics

Geography
Fish Lake is in this township.

Cities and towns
 Millersburg (north three-quarters)

Adjacent townships
 Middlebury Township (north)
 Newbury Township, LaGrange County (northeast)
 Eden Township, LaGrange County (east)
 Perry Township, Noble County (southeast)
 Benton Township (south)
 Jackson Township (southwest)
 Elkhart Township (west)
 Jefferson Township (northwest)

Major highways

Cemeteries
The township contains at least six cemeteries: Clinton Brick Mennonite, Clinton Union, Nisley, Rock Run, Thomas, and Woodlawn

References
 
 United States Census Bureau cartographic boundary files

External links
 Indiana Township Association
 United Township Association of Indiana

Townships in Elkhart County, Indiana
Townships in Indiana